Marcin Warcholak (born 8 August 1989) is a Polish professional footballer who plays as a left-back for Olimpia Grudziądz.

Honours

Club
Arka Gdynia
 I liga: 2015–16
 Polish Cup: 2016–17
 Polish Super Cup: 2017

References

External links
 

Polish footballers
1989 births
Living people
Gryf Wejherowo players
OKS Stomil Olsztyn players
Arka Gdynia players
Wisła Płock players
Miedź Legnica players
Olimpia Grudziądz players
Ekstraklasa players
III liga players
II liga players
I liga players
People from Wschowa
Association football defenders